Falsilunatia eltanini is a species of predatory sea snail, a marine gastropod mollusk in the family Naticidae, the moon snails.

Distribution

Description 
The maximum recorded shell length is 18.5 mm.

Habitat 
Minimum recorded depth is 2452 m. Maximum recorded depth is 2818 m.

References

External links

Naticidae
Gastropods described in 1990